Imaginative Illusions Sdn. Bhd. is a multimedia and software development company based in Johor Bahru, Johor, Malaysia. The company was founded in 1997, and specializes in developing games for the PC, software engineering, web hosting, and internet services. Imaginative Illusions Sdn. Bhd. is also a 3D Production studio which provides services in 3D Graphics and video development, animation, compositing, editing and special effects. The company has developed the shoot 'em up game for the PC titled "Vanguard Ace."

References

External links
 Official website

Privately held companies of Malaysia
Companies established in 1997
1997 establishments in Malaysia